Agnigarh (Pron:/ægɪˈgɑː/) is a hillock located in Tezpur, Assam, India. In Hindu mythology, it is the site of the fortress which was built by Banasura to keep his daughter Usha in isolation. The name itself is derived from the words 'Agni' (meaning fire) and 'garh' (meaning fortress or wall) in Sanskrit.

Legend
Legend has it that this fortress was surrounded by fire at all times so that nobody could go in or out of the perimeter without permission. Usha fell in love with Aniruddha in her dreams, not knowing  that he was the grandson of Krishna. Her companion Chitralekha identified him by painting his portrait from Usha's description. Chitralekha Udyan in Tezpur also known as 'Cole Park,' the biggest park in Tezpur, is named after her. Chitralekha was not only an artist but one possessing mystical powers. Anirudddha was Krishna's grandson and Usha, the daughter of an Asura king, therefore was no way any side would consent to their love. She flew one night and brought Aniruddha to Usha's place while he was still sleeping, using her powers. When Aniruddha opened his eyes and saw Usha, he fell in love immediately. However, Banasura was furious on knowing this, and tied him with snakes and imprisoned him. Lord Krishna, however had agreed for their marriage and had wanted for Banasura to consent for the same. Banasura was a great devotee of Lord Shiva, and as a boon had asked him and his entire family to guard the gates of his city, Tezpur. He therefore was not at all scared by Lord Krishna's wrath. A war ensued between the Hari (Lord Krishna and his followers) and the Hars (Lord Shiva and his followers), rivers of blood flowed and the city was named Tezpur (City of Blood). Both sides were nearly wiped out and a final battle followed between Lord Shiva and Lord Krishna, Lord Brahma requested both of them to stop the war by putting him between them. A discussion followed in which Lord Krishna made Lord Shiva see that Banasura was acting wrongly in imprisoning his grandson, and had even disrespected Lord Shiva himself in asking him and his family to be his gate keepers. Lord Shiva agreed, and Banasura was brought. Fearing his life he immediately agreed to the marriage. 

The stone sculptures on the Agnigarh hill portray this entire picturesque story of love and great war.

Current state
Present day Agnigarh is a hill on the banks of the Brahmaputra which is one of the big tourist attractions in Tezpur. There is a circular stairway leading up to the crest of the hill where there are now sculptures depicting Usha's abduction of Aniruddha, the grandson of Krishna and the ensuing battle by Krishna to free them. There is a tall viewing platform from where the entire Tezpur town can be seen. We can also see the Kalia- Bhumura bridge which shines like a beautiful necklace over the vast Brahmaputra river.

See also
Banasura
Chitralekha
Usha

References

External links
Lanes of Assam

Tezpur
Tourist attractions in Assam
Hills of Assam